The Haskell Indian Nations Fighting Indians are the athletic teams that represent Haskell Indian Nations University, located in Lawrence, Kansas, in intercollegiate sports as a member of the National Association of Intercollegiate Athletics (NAIA), primarily competing as an NAIA Independent within the Continental Athletic Conference since the 2015–16 academic year. The Fighting Indians previously competed in the defunct Midlands Collegiate Athletic Conference (MCAC) from 2001–02 to 2014–15 (when the conference dissolve).

Varsity teams
HINU competes in 11 intercollegiate varsity sports: Men's sports include basketball, cross country, golf and track & field (indoor and outdoor); women's sports include basketball, cross country, softball, track & field (indoor and outdoor) and volleyball. Club sports include baseball and boxing. Former sports included football and co-ed cheerleading.

Football

Haskell fielded their first football team in 1896. From the 1900s to the 1930s, Haskell’s football program was referred to as the “Powerhouse of the West,” playing teams such as Harvard, Yale, Brown, Missouri, Nebraska, Texas, Texas A&M, Oklahoma, Oklahoma A&M, Wisconsin and Minnesota. But in 1931, a new superintendent (R. D. Baldwin) made the decision to shift the college football team to high school status following the 1931 season. With fewer teams available to play, Haskell dropped football after the 1938 season. Football at Haskell would not be resumed again until 1990.

Due to funding shortfalls, Haskell suspended football for the 2015 season.

Men's basketball
Men's basketball at Haskell has brought nationwide attention with its ability to bring Native American talent to the basketball court.

Women's basketball
Women's basketball at Haskell Indian Nations University has made several post-season appearances including the Indian College National Basketball Tournament.

Fight song
Haskell Indian Nations Fighting Indians fight song is named Onward Haskell.

See also
 Native American mascot controversy

References

External links